This page shows the results of the Taekwondo Competition at the 1999 Pan American Games, held in Winnipeg, Manitoba, Canada at the Winnipeg Convention Centre. There were a total number of eight medal events, four for both men and women.

Medal table

Medalists

Men

Women

References

P
1999